"If You Only Knew" is the fourth single by American rock band Shinedown from their 2008 album, The Sound of Madness. The music video premiered on October 6, 2009.

The song was written about Brent Smith's ex-girlfriend when she was pregnant with their child.  Smith has described the song as "their first ballad".

The song was used in a promo for ABC's daytime drama One Life to Live.

"If You Only Knew" was certified platinum by the RIAA for selling over 1,000,000 copies.

Background
After Shinedown recorded their second studio album Us and Them, Smith decided to take time off before starting on the next studio album. In an interview with The Oklahoman, Smith said he would "never do a love song, ever" but changed his mind after falling in love with an old friend he reunited with. Smith explained "If You Only Knew" was "about the person that you love and that you miss and that you still believe in, and that's the only thing that you have to hold onto sometimes."

Charts
On the week ending November 14, 2009, "If You Only Knew" debuted on the Billboard Hot 100 at number 92. Five weeks later, it peaked at number 42. On the week ending February 6, 2010, it matched its peak. "If You Only Knew" peaked at number 64 on the Canadian Hot 100.

Weekly charts

Year-end charts

Music video
This video takes place on the steel skeleton of a skyscraper in New York City that has yet to be finished being built. While the video's primary focus is the band playing, there are also shots of couples standing around the building's rafters.

Certifications

References 

Shinedown songs
2008 songs
2009 singles
Songs written by Brent Smith
Rock ballads
Song recordings produced by Rob Cavallo
Songs written by Dave Bassett (songwriter)
Atlantic Records singles